Clay is a type of fine-grained natural soil  material containing clay minerals (hydrous aluminium phyllosilicates, e.g. kaolin, Al2Si2O5(OH)4).

Clays develop plasticity when wet, due to a molecular film of water surrounding the clay particles, but become hard, brittle and non–plastic upon drying or firing. Most pure clay minerals are white or light-coloured, but natural clays show a variety of colours from impurities, such as a reddish or brownish colour from small amounts of iron oxide.

Clay is the oldest known ceramic material. Prehistoric humans discovered the useful properties of clay and used it for making pottery. Some of the earliest pottery shards have been dated to around 14,000 BC, and clay tablets were the first known writing medium. Clay is used in many modern industrial processes, such as paper making, cement production, and chemical filtering. Between one-half and two-thirds of the world's population live or work in buildings made with clay, often baked into brick, as an essential part of its load-bearing structure.

Clay is a very common substance. Shale, formed largely from clay, is the most common sedimentary rock. Although many naturally occurring deposits include both silts and clay, clays are distinguished from other fine-grained soils by differences in size and mineralogy. Silts, which are fine-grained soils that do not include clay minerals, tend to have larger particle sizes than clays. Mixtures of sand, silt and less than 40% clay are called loam. Soils high in swelling clays (expansive clay), which are clay minerals that readily expand in volume when they absorb water, are a major challenge in civil engineering.

Properties 
The defining mechanical property of clay is its plasticity when wet and its ability to harden when dried or fired. Clays show a broad range of water content within which they are highly plastic, from a minimum water content (called the plastic limit) where the clay is just moist enough to mould, to a maximum water content (called the liquid limit) where the moulded clay is just dry enough to hold its shape. The plastic limit of kaolinite clay ranges from about 36% to 40% and its liquid limit ranges from about 58% to 72%. High-quality clay is also tough, as measured by the amount of mechanical work required to roll a sample of clay flat. Its toughness reflects a high degree of internal cohesion.

Clay has a high content of clay minerals that give it its plasticity. Clay minerals are hydrous aluminium phyllosilicate minerals, composed of aluminium and silicon ions bonded into tiny, thin plates by interconnecting oxygen and hydroxide ions. These plates are tough but flexible, and in moist clay, they adhere to each other. The resulting aggregates give clay the cohesion that makes it plastic. In kaolinite clay, the bonding between plates is provided by a film of water molecules that hydrogen bond the plates together. The bonds are weak enough to allow the plates to slip past each other when the clay is being moulded, but strong enough to hold the plates in place and allow the moulded clay to retain its shape after it is moulded. When the clay is dried, most of the water molecules are removed, and the plates hydrogen bond directly to each other, so that the dried clay is rigid but still fragile. If the clay is moistened again, it will once more become plastic. When the clay is fired to the earthenware stage, a dehydration reaction removes additional water from the clay, causing clay plates to irreversibly adhere to each other via stronger covalent bonding, which strengthens the material. The clay mineral kaolinite is transformed into a non-clay material, metakaolin, which remains rigid and hard if moistened again. Further firing through the stoneware and porcelain stages further recrystallizes the metakaolin into yet stronger minerals such as mullite.

The tiny size and plate form of clay particles gives clay minerals a high surface area. In some clay minerals, the plates carry a negative electrical charge that is balanced by a surrounding layer of positive ions (cations), such as sodium, potassium, or calcium. If the clay is mixed with a solution containing other cations, these can swap places with the cations in the layer around the clay particles, which gives clays a high capacity for ion exchange. The chemistry of clay minerals, including their capacity to retain nutrient cations such as potassium and ammonium, is important to soil fertility.

Clay is a common component of sedimentary rock. Shale is formed largely from clay and is the most common of sedimentary rocks. However, most clay deposits are impure. Many naturally occurring deposits include both silts and clay. Clays are distinguished from other fine-grained soils by differences in size and mineralogy. Silts, which are fine-grained soils that do not include clay minerals, tend to have larger particle sizes than clays. There is, however, some overlap in particle size and other physical properties.  The distinction between silt and clay varies by discipline. Geologists and soil scientists usually consider the separation to occur at a particle size of 2 μm (clays being finer than silts), sedimentologists often use 4–5 μm, and colloid chemists use 1 μm. Geotechnical engineers distinguish between silts and clays based on the plasticity properties of the soil, as measured by the soils' Atterberg limits. ISO 14688 grades clay particles as being smaller than 2 μm and silt particles as being larger. Mixtures of sand, silt and less than 40% clay are called loam.

Some clay minerals (such as smectite) are described as swelling clay minerals, because they have a great capacity to take up water, and they increase greatly in volume when they do so. When dried, they shrink back to their original volume. This produces distinctive textures, such as mudcracks or "popcorn" texture, in clay deposits. Soils containing swelling clay minerals (such as bentonite) pose a considerable challenge for civil engineering, because swelling clay can break foundations of buildings and ruin road beds.

Formation 

Clay minerals most commonly form by prolonged chemical weathering of silicate-bearing rocks. They can also form locally from hydrothermal activity. Chemical weathering takes place largely by acid hydrolysis due to low concentrations of carbonic acid, dissolved in rainwater or released by plant roots. The acid breaks bonds between aluminium and oxygen, releasing other metal ions and silica (as a gel of orthosilicic acid).)

The clay minerals formed depend on the composition of the source rock and the climate. Acid weathering of feldspar-rich rock, such as granite, in warm climates tends to produce kaolin. Weathering of the same kind of rock under alkaline conditions produces illite. Smectite forms by weathering of igneous rock under alkaline conditions, while gibbsite forms by intense weathering of other clay minerals.

There are two types of clay deposits: primary and secondary. Primary clays form as residual deposits in soil and remain at the site of formation. Secondary clays are clays that have been transported from their original location by water erosion and deposited in a new sedimentary deposit. Secondary clay deposits are typically associated with very low energy depositional environments such as large lakes and marine basins.

Varieties 
The main groups of clays include kaolinite, montmorillonite-smectite, and illite. Chlorite, vermiculite, talc, and pyrophyllite are sometimes also classified as clay minerals.  There are approximately 30 different types of "pure" clays in these categories, but most "natural" clay deposits are mixtures of these different types, along with other weathered minerals. Clay minerals in clays are most easily identified using X-ray diffraction rather than chemical or physical tests.

Varve (or varved clay) is clay with visible annual layers that are formed by seasonal deposition of those layers and are marked by differences in erosion and organic content. This type of deposit is common in former glacial lakes. When fine sediments are delivered into the calm waters of these glacial lake basins away from the shoreline, they settle to the lake bed. The resulting seasonal layering is preserved in an even distribution of clay sediment banding.

Quick clay is a unique type of marine clay indigenous to the glaciated terrains of Norway, North America, Northern Ireland, and Sweden. It is a highly sensitive clay, prone to liquefaction, and has been involved in several deadly landslides.

Uses 

Modelling clay is used in art and handicraft for sculpting.
Clays are used for making pottery, both utilitarian and decorative, and construction products, such as bricks, walls, and floor tiles. Different types of clay, when used with different minerals and firing conditions, are used to produce earthenware, stoneware, and porcelain. Prehistoric humans discovered the useful properties of clay. Some of the earliest pottery shards recovered are from central Honshu, Japan. They are associated with the Jōmon culture, and recovered deposits have been dated to around 14,000 BC. Cooking pots, art objects, dishware, smoking pipes, and even musical instruments such as the ocarina can all be shaped from clay before being fired. 

Clay tablets were the first known writing medium. Scribes wrote by inscribing them with cuneiform script using a blunt reed called a stylus. Purpose-made clay balls were used as sling ammunition. Clay is used in many industrial processes, such as paper making, cement production, and chemical filtering. Bentonite clay is widely used as a mold binder in the manufacture of sand castings.

Medicine 

Traditional uses of clay as medicine goes back to prehistoric times. An example is Armenian bole, which is used to soothe an upset stomach. Some animals such as parrots and pigs ingest clay for similar reasons. Kaolin clay and attapulgite have been used as anti-diarrheal medicines.

Construction 

Clay as the defining ingredient of loam is one of the oldest building materials on Earth, among other ancient, naturally-occurring geologic materials such as stone and organic materials like wood.  Also a primary ingredient in many natural building techniques, clay is used to create adobe, cob, cordwood, and structures and building elements such as wattle and daub, clay plaster, clay render case, clay floors and clay paints and ceramic building material. Clay was used as a mortar in brick chimneys and stone walls where protected from water.

The forecasted mass of clay minerals to be discharged into the tailings of ore processing makes up millions of tons. Worryingly, when macro- and micro-components are found in non-hazardous concentrations, fewer efforts are put into the environmental management of the tailings, though technogenic sediments offer prospects for reuse and valorization beyond their traditional disposal. Saponite is a demonstrative example of the tailings constituent that is often left unfairly mistreated. Electrochemical separation helps to obtain modified saponite-containing products with high smectite-group minerals concentrations, lower mineral particles size, more compact structure, and greater surface area. These characteristics open possibilities for the manufacture of high-quality ceramics and heavy-metal sorbents from saponite-containing products. Furthermore, tail grinding occurs during the preparation of the raw material for ceramics; this waste reprocessing is of high importance for the use of clay pulp as a neutralizing agent, as fine particles are required for the reaction. Experiments on the Histosol deacidification with the alkaline clay slurry demonstrated that neutralization with the average pH level of 7.1 is reached at 30% of the pulp added and an experimental site with perennial grasses proved the efficacy of the technique.

Clay, relatively impermeable to water, is also used where natural seals are needed, such as in the cores of dams, or as a barrier in landfills against toxic seepage (lining the landfill, preferably in combination with geotextiles). Studies in the early 21st century have investigated clay's absorption capacities in various applications, such as the removal of heavy metals from waste water and air purification.

See also

Notes

References 
 Clay mineral nomenclature American Mineralogist.
 
 
 
 
 
 
 
 
 Ehlers, Ernest G. and Blatt, Harvey (1982). 'Petrology, Igneous, Sedimentary, and Metamorphic' San Francisco: W.H. Freeman and Company.  .
 
 
 
 
 
 
 Hillier S. (2003) "Clay Mineralogy." pp 139–142 In Middleton G.V., Church M.J., Coniglio M., Hardie L.A. and Longstaffe F.J. (Editors) Encyclopedia of Sediments and Sedimentary Rocks. Kluwer Academic Publishers, Dordrecht.

External links 

 The Clay Minerals Group of the Mineralogical Society
 Information about clays used in the UK pottery industry
 The Clay Minerals Society
 Organic Matter in Clays

 
Types of soil
Sculpture materials
Natural materials
Sedimentology
Sediments
Phyllosilicates
Soil-based building materials